Transformation is a quarterly peer-reviewed academic journal that publishes papers in the field of Mission studies. The journal's editor-in-chief is Paul Woods (Oxford Centre for Mission Studies). It was established in 1984 and is currently published by SAGE Publications in association with the Oxford Centre for Mission Studies.

Abstracting and indexing 
Transformation is abstracted and indexed in:
 Academic Premier
 ATLA Religion Database
 Index theologicus
 Religion & Philosophy Collection
 Theology Digest

External links 
 

SAGE Publishing academic journals
English-language journals
Quarterly journals
Publications established in 1984